is a Japanese politician of the Democratic Party of Japan, a member of the House of Representatives in the Diet (national legislature). A native of Kyoto, Kyoto, he attended the University of Kyoto as both undergraduate and graduate. He also studied at Lund University in Sweden for two years. He was elected to the House of Representatives for the first time in 2000.

References

External links
 Official website in Japanese.

Living people
1962 births
Democratic Party of Japan politicians
Members of the House of Representatives (Japan)
Kyoto University alumni
Lund University alumni
21st-century Japanese politicians